Carrauntoohil or Carrauntoohill (meaning "Tuathal's sickle") is the highest mountain in Ireland at . It is on the Iveragh Peninsula in County Kerry, close to the centre of Ireland's highest mountain range, MacGillycuddy's Reeks. Carrauntoohil is composed mainly of sandstone, whose glaciation produced distinctive features on the mountain such as the Eagle's Nest corrie and some deep gullies and sharp arêtes in its east and northeastern faces that are popular with rock and winter climbers.

As Ireland's highest mountain, Carrauntoohil is popular with mountain walkers, who most commonly ascend via the Devil's Ladder route; however, Carrauntoohil is also climbed as part of longer mountain walking routes in the MacGillycuddy's Reeks range, including the  Coomloughra Horseshoe or the  MacGillycuddy's Reeks Ridge Walk of the entire mountain range. Carrauntoohil, and most of the range is held in private ownership and is not part of any Irish national park; however, reasonable access is granted to the public for recreational use.

Geology

Carrauntoohil is composed of sandstone particles of various sizes which are collectively known as Old Red Sandstone. Old Red Sandstone has a purple-reddish colour (stained green in places), and has virtually no fossils; it dates from the Devonian period (410 to 350 million years ago) when Ireland was in a hot equatorial climate.

Carrauntoohil was later subject to significant glaciation during the last ice age, the result of which is deep fracturing of the rock, and the surrounding of Carrauntoohil by U-shaped valleys, sharp arêtes, and deep corries.

Geography

Carrauntoohil is the central peak of the MacGillycuddy's Reeks range, and has three major ridges. A third and much wider unnamed south-easterly ridge, or spur, leads down to a col where sits the top of the Devil's Ladder (the classic access route for Carrauntoohil from the Hag's Glen), but then rises back up to Cnoc na Toinne , from which the long easterly ridge section of MacGillycuddy's Reeks is accessed.

Carrauntoohil overlooks three U-shaped valleys, each of which containing their own lakes. To the east of Carrauntoohil is the Hag's Glen, to the west is Coomloughra, and to the south is Curragh More.

Carrauntoohil has a deep corrie, known as the Eagle's Nest, at its north-east face, which is accessed from the Hag's Glen, and rises up through three levels. At the top, the third level, is Lough Cummeenoughter, Ireland's highest lake. The Eagle's Nest gives views of the gullies on Carrauntoohil's north-east face: Curved Gully, Central Gully, and Brother O'Shea's Gully. Sometimes the term Eagle's Nest is used to refer to the small stone Mountain Rescue Hut that sits on the first level of the corrie, where the Heavenly Gates descent gully meets the Eagle's Nest corrie.

Carrauntoohil is the highest mountain in Ireland on all classification scales. It is the 133rd-highest mountain, and 4th most prominent mountain, in Britain and Ireland, on the Simms classification. Carrauntoohil is regarded by the Scottish Mountaineering Club (SMC) as one of 34 Furths, which are defined as mountains above  in elevation and meeting the SMC criteria for a Munro (i.e. "sufficient separation"), and which are outside (or furth), of Scotland; this is why Carrauntoohil is also referred to as one of the thirteen Irish Munros.

Carrauntoohil's larger prominence qualifies it to meet the P600 classification and the Britain and Ireland Marilyn classification. Carrauntoohil is the highest mountain in the MountainViews Online Database, 100 Highest Irish Mountains.

Summit

In the 1950s, a wooden cross was erected on the summit, a privately owned commonage, by the local community. In 1976, the wooden cross was replaced by a  steel cross. In 2014, the cross was cut down by unknown persons in protest against the Catholic Church, but it was re-erected shortly after.

Because of the dangers of the steep north-eastern and eastern faces of Carrauntoohil, the Kerry Mountain Rescue Team (KMRT) have placed danger signs on the summit, and particularly above the Howling Ridge sector (the ridge between the north-east and east faces), whose initial section can be mistaken for a hill-walkers descent route.

Naming

Carrauntoohil is the most common and official spelling of the name, being the only version in use by Ordnance Survey Ireland, the Placenames Database of Ireland, and by Irish academic Paul Tempan, compiler of the Irish Hill and Mountain Names database (2010). Carrauntoohill has also been used in the past, for example by Irish historian Patrick Weston Joyce in 1870. Other less common spelling variations have included Carrantoohil, Carrantouhil, Carrauntouhil and Carrantuohill; all of which are anglicisations of the same Irish-language name.

Paul Tempan's Irish Hill and Mountain Names notes that Carrauntoohil's Irish name "is shrouded in uncertainty", and that "Unlike some lesser peaks, such as Mangerton or Croagh Patrick, it is not mentioned in any surviving early Irish texts". Patrick Weston Joyce previously interpreted it as "inverted sickle", translating from the Irish language term  meaning left-handed but according to PWJ, "is applied to everything reversed from its proper direction".

Ownership

The climber and author Jim Ryan noted in his 2006 book Carrauntoohil and MacGillycuddy’s Reeks that the actual mountain of Carrauntoohil, including most of the Hag's Glen, is in private ownership. The freehold is owned by four families: Donal Doona, John O'Shea, John B. Doona, and James Sullivan. Their great-grandfathers bought the land from the Irish Land Commission, "paying the sum of eleven shillings and two pence (70  in today's money), twice a year for many decades". Ryan's book commended the owners for providing access over the years, despite damage to their farms.

A state-sponsored report into access for the range in December 2013 titled MacGillycuddy Reeks Mountain Access Development Assessment (also called the Mountain Access Project, or MAP), mapped the complex network of land titles. Unlike many other national mountain ranges, MacGillycuddy's Reeks are not part of a national park or a trust structure, and are instead completely privately owned.

The ownership situation has raised concerns in light of the material rise in visitors to Carrauntoohil (and the range in general), and the erosion and lack of infrastructure that other state-owned sites have been able to address. In 2019 the Irish Times reported that the MacGillycuddy Reeks Mountain Access Forum, a cross-body group of landowners, commercial users and public access and walking groups set up in 2014 with the aim of "protecting, managing and sustainably developing the MacGillycuddy’s Reeks mountain range, while halting and reversing the obvious and worsening path erosion", had achieved some success laying down new pathways in the Hag's Glen approach to Carrauntoohil; however, the Irish Times still wondered, "Should the Kerry reeks be a national park?"

Recreation

Visitors

Separate statistics do not exist for visitors or ascensions of the stand-alone peak of Carrauntoohil, however, it was recorded that over 125,000 accessed the range in 2017, and 140,000 accessed the range in 2018, the majority of which are related to Carrauntoohil. The attraction of the mountain has led to many accidents and fatalities over the years, and by the 50th anniversary of the KMRT in 2017, they recorded having attended more than 40 fatalities in the range noting that many were "in the immediate Carrauntoohil area". Accidents on the mountain have been attributed to bad weather, late departures combined with darkness on the way down and falling rocks in eroded areas.

Mountain walking

The straightforward route is via the Devil's Ladder, which starts at Cronin's Yard in the north-east, moves into the Hag's Glen, continues along between Lough Gouragh and Lough Calee, until the Devil's Ladder, a worn path from the glen to the col between Carrauntoohil and Cnoc na Toinne  is visible. No special climbing equipment is needed, but caution is advised as the Devil's Ladder has become unstable with overuse; alternatives to the ladder include the Bothar na Gige Zig Zag track (the north-east spur of Cnoc na Toinne ).

Other popular, but more serious, routes to Carrauntoohil from the Hag's Glen are via the Hag's Tooth Ridge up to Beenkeragh, and then across the Beenkeragh Ridge to Carrauntoohil; or via the Eagle's Nest route to Lough Cummeenoughter, Ireland's highest lake, and up to the summit via Brother O'Shea's Gully or Curved Gully.

Instead of descending via the Devil's Ladder, some climbers use a route known as the Heavenly Gates, which starts above the col of the Devil's Ladder but takes a small stone path that cuts across the east-face of Carrauntoohil, through a narrow gap, known as the Heavenly Gates (see photo), and then heads diagonally down a deep gully to the base of the first level of the Eagle's Nest corrie, where the Mountain Rescue Hut is situated. This route, however, is hazardous, difficult to find as it is not marked, and particularly dangerous in poor visibility; it has been the source of several serious accidents on Carrauntoohil.

A strenuous undertaking is the  Coomloughra Horseshoe, which takes 6–8 hours and is described as "one of Ireland’s classic ridge walks". It starts from the north-west up the Hydro-Track, and is usually done clockwise, first climbing Skregmore , and then to Beenkeragh , across the famous Beenkeragh Ridge, at the centre of which is The Bones , and on to the summit of Carrauntoohil itself. The horseshoe is completed by continuing to Caher , Caher West Top , and descending to the starting point. Carrauntoohil is also climbed as part of the full MacGillycuddy's Reeks Ridge Walk, a 12- to 14-hour,  traverse of the entire Reeks range.

Rock and winter climbing

Although the Reeks are not particularly known for their advanced rock climbing (e.g. unlike Ailladie in Clare, or Fair Head in Antrim), the east face of Carrauntoohil, looking into the Hag's Glen, and the north-east face, looking into Brothers O'Shea's Gully, have a number of multi-pitch, mixed route, rock climbing routes. The most well-known is the  Howling Ridge (climbing grade Very Difficult, or V-Diff), which starts at the base of the gap of Heavenly Gates, and takes the arête between Carrauntoohil's east and north-east faces.

These same east and north-east faces are also used for winter climbing, conditions permitting, and seven routes of climbing grade V are marked amongst almost eighty routes in total.

See also
List of highest points of European countries
List of P600 mountains in the British Isles
Lists of long-distance trails in the Republic of Ireland

Bibliography

Notes

References

External links

MountainViews: The Irish Mountain Website, Carrauntoohil
The Database of British and Irish Hills , the largest database of British Isles mountains ("DoBIH")
Hill Bagging UK & Ireland, the searchable interface for the DoBIH

Marilyns of Ireland
Hewitts of Ireland
Mountains and hills of County Kerry
Highest points of Irish counties
Furths
One-thousanders of Ireland
Iveragh Peninsula
Highest points of countries
Mountains and hills of Ireland